Robert Balmer (born 1 January 1882) was an English professional footballer who played for Everton between 1903 and 1912. His brother Billy and nephew Jack were also professional footballers.

References

1882 births
Year of death missing
Footballers from Liverpool
English footballers
Association football fullbacks
Everton F.C. players
English Football League players
FA Cup Final players